Patrick "Rick" Goldring (born August 23, 1957) is a Canadian politician who served as the 28th mayor of Burlington, Ontario from 2010 to 2018. He graduated from McMaster University with a Bachelor of Arts degree in Economics.

Politics 
Goldring ran in a federal by-election for the Green Party of Canada in 2006. He had been a member of the Burlington City Council after winning the 2006 municipal election for ward 5. Goldring had previously served two terms as mayor of Burlington, Ontario from 2010 to 2018.

Personal life 
Goldring was born in Paris, Ontario. His family later moved to Burlington, Ontario where Goldring grew up on Woodland Park Drive in the Roseland community of Burlington. His father was a bank manager, his mother was a high school teacher. His parents met in Montego Bay, Jamaica while on vacation in March 1956. They were married in September of that year and Goldring was born in August 1957. Goldring attended Laurie Smith and Tecumseh elementary schools and Nelson High School. Goldring resides in Burlington, Ontario with his wife Cheryl and their combined 7 children.

Electoral record

References

External links

Green Party of Canada politicians
Living people
Mayors of Burlington, Ontario
McMaster University alumni
Burlington, Ontario city councillors
1957 births